Hickory Flat may refer to several places in the United States:

 Hickory Flat, Alabama
 Hickory Flat, Georgia
 Hickory Flat, Kentucky
 Hickory Flat, Mississippi
 Hickory Flat, Tennessee
 Hickory Flat, Virginia